Pilotburg Church is a historic church building southeast of the town of Wellman, Iowa, United States. It was listed on the National Register of Historic Places in 1996. The former church building is the only remaining structure from the town of Pilotburg, which had been established in 1839 as Pilots Grove. Built by the Methodist Episcopal Church in 1881, it was the second church in the town. The frame structure measures . In the 1950s the church was moved from its original limestone foundation, still extant, to a poured/concrete block basement. A kitchen was added inside at the same time. The Methodist congregation disbanded in 1968, and the church was sold and converted into a house.

References

Churches completed in 1881
Methodist churches in Iowa
Churches on the National Register of Historic Places in Iowa
Victorian architecture in Iowa
Buildings and structures in Washington County, Iowa
National Register of Historic Places in Washington County, Iowa
1881 establishments in Iowa